is a Japanese actress and musician. She was the vocalist and guitarist for the band Kinoko Teikoku. She was born in Iwate Prefecture, and attended the private Yakumo Gakuen High School in Tokyo.

Filmography

Film
Hōtai Club (2007)
Cast: (2019)

Drama
Joshi Ana Icchokusen! (2007)
Honto ni Atta Kowai Hanashi (2006)
My Boss, My Hero (2006)
Chichi ni Kanaderu Melody (2005)
Akai Unmei  (2005)
Chakushin ari (2005)
Aozora Koi Hoshi (2005)

Discography

Albums
 Planet (2019) No. 38 Japan
Koe (2021)

Extended plays
 SickSickSickSick (2018)

Award
29th HoriPro Talent Scout Campaign Grand Prix Award (2004)

References

Sources
http://www.jdorama.com/artiste.2526.htm
https://web.archive.org/web/20080406084805/http://www.tokyograph.com/info/Chiaki_Sato

External links
Official Profile

1988 births
Japanese actresses
People from Iwate Prefecture
Living people